Gary Adornado Bejino (born November 6, 1995) is a Filipino swimmer who competed at the 2020 Summer Paralympics.

Early life
Gary Bejino was born on November 6, 1995 and was the second eldest in a brood of six. His father is a laborer while his mother is a homemaker. At age 7, he acquired his disability when he was electrocuted when he held on to a live power cable. He sustained serious burns which required his right arm and left leg to be amputated. Growing up in Albay, Bejino spent his 1st to 4th grade elementary education before moving to a foundation ran by priests.

Career
Bejino took up swimming when he moved to Metro Manila. He represented his school at the 2013 Palarong Pambansa in Dumaguete in para-swimming, bagging three gold medals and was scouted by national coach Tony Ong who is looking for swimmers for the 2013 Asian Youth Para Games in Malaysia He was entered in the 2013 Asian Youth Para Games where he won a silver and a bronze medal.

He participated at the 2015 ASEAN Para Games in Singapore where he clinched a gold medal in the men's 400-meter freestyle. He won another gold in the 2017 edition. He also competed in the 2018 Asian Para Games in Indonesia where he clinch one silver and two bronze medals.

He qualified to compete in the 2020 Summer Paralympics in Tokyo through a bipartite invitation.

References

Living people
1995 births
Filipino male swimmers
Swimmers at the 2020 Summer Paralympics
Sportspeople from Albay
Paralympic swimmers of the Philippines
Filipino amputees
S6-classified Paralympic swimmers
S7-classified Paralympic swimmers
20th-century Filipino people
21st-century Filipino people
Medalists at the 2018 Asian Para Games